K6 or K-6 may refer to:

Locations
 K6 (mountain), a mountain in Pakistan
 K6 pipe, a geological formation in Northern Alberta, Canada
 K6, shorthand for ul. Konwiktorska 6, address of the Stadion Miejski im. gen. Kazimierza Sosnkowskiego

Transportation
 HMS K6, a British submarine
 USS K-6 (SS-37), a 1914 United States Navy K-class submarine
 Ka 6, a glider manufactured by Alexander Schleicher GmbH & Co, Germany
 K6, IATA code for Cambodia Angkor Air
 K 6 (keelboat), sailboat class
 K-6 (1926–1927 Kansas highway), now part of K-9
 K-6 (1927–1958 Kansas highway), now part of US 59
 K-6 (1968–1981 Kansas highway), now K-5

Other uses
 K-6 (education), the grades which are traditionally grouped together in American elementary schools; formerly Kindergarten through sixth grade
 , a 12.7 mm heavy machine gun of South Korea based on M2 Browning
K-6 (missile), an Indian ballistic missile
 K6 Telephone Kiosk, a type of red telephone box in use the United Kingdom since 1935
 AMD K6, a computer microprocessor
K6 (load testing tool)
 Sonata in C for Keyboard and Violin, sixth work by Wolfgang Amadeus Mozart according to the Köchel catalogue
 Grushin K-6, a Soviet Air to air missile developed in the 1950s
 Kimber K6S, a revolver